Lloyd Fairbanks (born April 28, 1953, in Raymond, Alberta) is a former Canadian Football League offensive lineman who played seventeen seasons in the CFL. Fairbanks was named to the CFL's All-Star team 5 times.

Fairbanks was announced as a member of the Canadian Football Hall of Fame 2023 class on March 16, 2023.

References

1953 births
Living people
Players of Canadian football from Alberta
Canadian football offensive linemen
Calgary Stampeders players
Montreal Concordes players
Montreal Alouettes players
Hamilton Tiger-Cats players
BYU Cougars football players
People from Raymond, Alberta
Canadian Latter Day Saints
Canadian players of American football